Susan Scarf Merrell is an American author who has published novels, short stories, and essays. Her second novel, Shirley, about a young woman who goes to live with novelist Shirley Jackson and Stanley Edgar Hyman in their Bennington home in 1964, was published June 12, 2014 by Blue Rider/Penguin Books.

Her short stories and essays have been published in Los Angeles Review of Books, Tin House, The Writer's Chronicle, The Southampton Review, and The New Haven Review. Her debut novel, A Member of the Family was published in 2001 after her publication of The Accidental Bond: How Sibling Connections Influence Adult Relationships in 1997.

A graduate of Cornell University's College of Arts & Sciences, Merrell received her MFA from the Bennington Writing Seminars at Bennington College and teaches in the MFA program at Stony Brook Southampton. She is also director of the Southampton Writers Conference.'Merrell is married to James Merrell. She is the daughter of journalist Maggie Scarf and economist Herbert Scarf. She has two sisters, Martha Samuelson and Betsy S. Stone.

 Publications The Accidental Bond: How Sibling Connections Influence Adult Relationships (1997) A Member of the Family: A Novel (2001) Shirley: A Novel'' (2014)

References

External links 

 

American magazine editors
Stony Brook University faculty
Living people
American women non-fiction writers
Women magazine editors
American women novelists
Cornell University alumni
Year of birth missing (living people)
20th-century American non-fiction writers
20th-century American women writers
21st-century American novelists
21st-century American women writers
Bennington College alumni
American women academics